Limata is a genus of biting horseflies of the family Tabanidae.

Species
Limata bedfordi Oldroyd, 1954
Limata capensis (Wiedemann, 1821)
Limata facialis Oldroyd, 1954
Limata karooensis Oldroyd, 1954
Limata kuhnelti Usher, 1967
Limata laevifrons (Loew, 1858)
Limata miranda Usher, 1968
Limata parafacialis Oldroyd, 1957
Limata seyrigi (Séguy, 1955)
Limata tenuicornis (Macquart, 1838)

References

Tabanidae
Diptera of Africa
Taxa named by Harold Oldroyd
Brachycera genera